Anubis is a 2016 Burmese mysterious horror film, directed by Lu Min starring Lu Min, Nay Toe, Wutt Hmone Shwe Yi and Shwe Hmone Yati. It is about the ancient god of Egypt, the Anubis and Car Racing. The film, produced by Aung Tine Kyaw Film Production premiered in Myanmar on September 9, 2016.

Cast
Lu Min as Than Lwin Htut Khaung
Nay Toe as La Pyae Kyaw
Wutt Hmone Shwe Yi as Selene
Shwe Hmone Yati as Than Lwin Akari

References

2016 films
2010s Burmese-language films
Burmese horror films
Films shot in Myanmar